Loopin' Louie, is an interactive electronic board game designed by Carol Wiseley and published by Milton Bradley in 1992. It was given the Kinderspiel des Jahres award in 1994. Although the game is designed for a maximum of 4 players, unofficial modifications were made by modders to increase the maximum number of players to eight. A Star Wars variation called "Loopin' Chewie" was produced by Hasbro in 2015.

In Europe, the game is also known as a drinking game. The Wall Street Journal describes it as one of Germany´s most popular drinking games and mentioned in 2014: "In Germany, a country with 81 million people, Looping Louie has sold more than 1.3 million copies since 2006—far more than in any other country".

Gameplay

Assembly
The game requires a screwdriver to assemble a central crane tower with a figure of the titular Louie in a biplane attached to the end of the crane. Up to four arms are connected to the tower, each with a canal, a barn, three chicken tokens and a lever (paddle). Two AA batteries are required for the motor to rotate the crane.

Rules
The object of the game is for players to press their respective levers to keep Louie in the air to stop him from knocking the chicken tokens into the canals. Players need to time their lever presses carefully. If Louie hits a chicken token on the barn, it falls down the canal. The player that has at least one chicken token remaining is the winner.

References

External links

Board games introduced in 1992
Children's board games
Milton Bradley Company games
Electronic board games
Kinderspiel des Jahres winners